Navoi is a crater on Mercury. It contains uncommon reddish material that indicates a different rock composition from its surroundings. Navoi also appears to have an irregularly shaped depression in its center. Such depressions have been seen elsewhere on Mercury, including within Praxiteles crater, and may indicate past volcanic activity.

References

Impact craters on Mercury